The 2015–16 Creighton Bluejays men's basketball team represented Creighton University in the 2015–16 NCAA Division I men's basketball season. The Bluejays, led by sixth-year head coach Greg McDermott, played their home games at the CenturyLink Center Omaha, and were members of the Big East Conference. They finished the season 20–15, 9–9 in Big East play to finish in sixth place. They lost to Seton Hall in the quarterfinals of the Big East tournament. They received an invitation to the National Invitation Tournament where, as a #4 seed, they defeated Alabama and Wagner to advance to the quarterfinals where they lost to BYU.

Previous season
The Bluejays finished the 2014–15 season 14–19, 4–14 in Big East play to finish last in the conference. They defeated DePaul in the first round of the Big East tournament and lost to Georgetown in the quarterfinals. The Bluejays finished with a losing record for the first time in 18 years, dating back to the 1995–96 season.

Off season

Departures

Incoming transfers

Incoming recruits

Roster

Depth chart

Schedule

|-
!colspan=9 style="background:#0C5FA8; color:#FFFFFF;"| Exhibition

|-
!colspan=9 style="background:#0C5FA8; color:#FFFFFF;"| Non-Conference Regular Season

|-
!colspan=9 style="background:#0C5FA8; color:#FFFFFF;"| Big East Conference Play

|-
!colspan=12 style="background:#0C5FA8; color:#FFFFFF;"| Big East tournament

|-
!colspan=12 style="background:#0C5FA8; color:#FFFFFF;"| National Invitation tournament

References

Creighton
Creighton Bluejays men's basketball seasons
Creighton
2015 in sports in Nebraska
2016 in sports in Nebraska